Forcillo is an Italian surname. Notable people with the surname include:

James Forcillo (born 1982), police officer convicted in the death of Sammy Yatim
Sammy Forcillo, Canadian politician

Italian-language surnames